Hushållsost ("household cheese") is a Swedish cows'-milk cheese.  It is a semi-hard cheese, with small granular holes, and is made from whole milk, which gives it a 26 percent fat content. There is also a version with less fat labeled "17% fetthalt".  Hushållsost is produced in cylinders weighing  each, which are today wrapped in plastic film before being aged around 60 days on average. The taste is described as mild yet somewhat sour. The cheese was traditionally produced on farms; the name hushållsost is found in print at least as early as 1898. It is closely related to Port-Salut cheese.

Consumed at a rate of 15 thousand tonnes a year, hushållsost is the most popular cheese in Sweden. It has Traditional Speciality Guaranteed (TSG) Status in the EU and the UK.

See also
 List of cheeses

References

External links
 Hushållsost application submitted to the European Union, 2003.
 Cheese.com page

Cow's-milk cheeses
Grainy cheeses
Swedish cheeses
Traditional Speciality Guaranteed products from Sweden